The Great Seal of Ireland was the seal used until 1922 by the Dublin Castle administration to authenticate important state documents in Ireland, in the same manner as the Great Seal of the Realm in England. The Great Seal of Ireland was used from at least the 1220s in the Lordship of Ireland and the ensuing Kingdom of Ireland, and remained in use when the island became part of the United Kingdom of Great Britain and Ireland (1801–1922), just as the Great Seal of Scotland remained in use after the Act of Union 1707. After 1922, the single Great Seal of Ireland was superseded by the separate Great Seal of the Irish Free State and Great Seal of Northern Ireland for the respective jurisdictions created by the partition of Ireland. If the Lord Chancellor was unable for whatever reason to transact business, the Crown might designate another senior judge to act in his place without the Great Seal. In 1375 John Keppock, the Lord Chief Justice of Ireland, was authorised to hear the assizes at Waterford in place of the Chancellor, who was detained on other official business, without the  Seal.Patent Roll 49 Edward III

Use
The office of "Lord Keeper of the Great Seal of Ireland" was held by the Lord Chancellor of Ireland. The Chancellor was presented with the physical seal upon taking his oath of office, and it was otherwise kept in the Court of Chancery. When the Chancellor was absent, Lords Commissioners of the Great Seal were appointed. The seal was affixed to documents issued by the Privy Council of Ireland and its head the chief governor (latterly called the Lord Lieutenant). In the fifteenth century, the Chief Governor was generally non-resident and was represented by a Lord Deputy. The Governor or Deputy would issue a type of writ called a fiant to the Lord Chancellor, mandating the issue of a patent ("letters patent") under the Great Seal. In the fourteenth century, the Chancellor was entitled to a guard of six men-at-arms and twelve mounted archers, in part to protect the seal in his custody. The Chief Governor was appointed in London under the Great Seal of England, but a 1498 Act allowed a vacancy to be temporarily filled by the Dublin administration under the Irish seal. This practice was applied several times in the 1690s.  In the fifteenth century, the Governor was appointed under the king's privy seal and appointed his Deputy under the Irish seal. From 1700 to 1767, non-resident Lords Lieutenant were appointed under the British Great Seal, and would in turn use the Irish seal to appoint resident Lord Justices as deputies.When  the Lord Chancellor went as a judge of assize he would take the Great Seal with him, despite constant complaints about "the dangers of the roads".

Before the Act of Union 1800, any bill passed by the Parliament of Ireland and approved by the Privy Council of Ireland was sent to London under the Great Seal of Ireland and, if approved by the Privy Council of England (later the Privy Council of Great Britain), was returned under the Great Seal of the Realm to be enacted. This procedure was required both under Poynings' Law (1495) and under the Constitution of 1782 which amended it. Parliament was summoned under the Great Seal of England rather than that of Ireland, even after 1782.

Titles in the Peerage of Ireland were originally created under the English seal. After the Williamite War they were usually created under the Irish seal, but creations under the British seal continued, even after the Constitution of 1782, until the Act of Union 1800. Robert Raymond, 1st Baron Raymond wrote that, under the British seal, the Irish nature of the peerage had to be made explicit. Sometimes a single patent created separate titles in the Irish and English/British peerages for the same person. When Lord Thurlow faulted Lord Loughborough for creating Irish peers under the British seal, Lord Eldon said Thurlow had also done so. After the Union, the question of whether Irish peers appointed under the British seal were entitled to vote for Irish representative peers was considered by the British House of Lords in 1805.

The 1289 "ordinance for the State of Ireland" forbade purveyance except by a commission under the Great Seal of Ireland. From the Tudor Reconquest, appointments to the Irish judiciary were made entirely under the Irish seal.

History
An Irish chancery was established in 1232 separate from the English chancery, and all documents issued from the Irish chancery were sealed with the "great seal of the king used in Ireland". Most thirteenth-century land grants continued to be issued in England with the English seal, and then sent to the Irish chancery to be enrolled. In 1256, King Henry III granted the Lordship of Ireland to his heir, the future Edward I, and ordered that Edward's personal seal should have "royal authority" there. Henry took Ireland back from Edward in 1258. Robert de Vere, Duke of Ireland was similarly authorised to use his own great seal by Richard II in 1385; Richard ordered de Vere's seal to be broken in 1389. In the 1300s, pardons for felony were granted under both the Irish and the English seals.

In 1417, the Chancellor, Laurence Merbury, refused to authenticate with the seal a petition to the King from the Parliament on the state of Ireland. In 1423, the Chancellor Richard Talbot, archbishop of Dublin, refused to acknowledge Edward Dantsey, Bishop of Meath, as Deputy because the Governor, Edmund Mortimer, 5th Earl of March, had appointed Dantsey with his privy seal instead of the Great Seal. In 1460, Richard of York, under threat of arrest in England, fled to Ireland and persuaded the parliament to pass a declaration of independence stating in part that Ireland was "corporate of itself" and that "henceforth no person or persons being in the said land of Ireland shall be, by any command given or made under any other seal than the said seal of the said land, compelled to answer to any appeal or any other matter out of the said land". The Lord Deputy Gerald FitzGerald, 8th Earl of Kildare refused Edward IV's command to annul this, and it was not until Poynings' Parliament in 1495 that this was done.

In 1478, after Kildare was replaced as Lord Deputy by Henry Grey, 4th (7th) Baron Grey of Codnor, the Lord Chancellor Rowland FitzEustace, 1st Baron Portlester, who was Kildare's father-in-law, organised a campaign of non-co-operation with the new Deputy and refused to hand over the Great Seal, making the conduct of official business impossible. Kildare argued that Grey had been appointed under the privy signet instead of the Irish Great Seal. King Edward IV ordered Thomas Archbold, the Master of the Royal Mint in Ireland, to strike a new Great Seal, "as near as he could to the pattern and fabric of the other, with the difference of a rose in every part". The King decreed that the Seal held by Portlester was annulled, and that all acts passed under it were utterly void; but to no avail.  So effective was the campaign of obstruction that after a few months Lord Grey was forced to return to England.

In 1484, clerk James Collynge was charged with forging the Great Seal of Ireland for a fake pardon to the treasurer of Limerick Cathedral, and outlawed unless he appeared before the Chief Justice of the Common Pleas.

One of the developments which Henry VII and the Tudor Reconquest of Ireland sought to reverse was that the Lord Deputy's private seal, kept by his secretary, was being used in place of the Great Seal of Ireland.

In 1638, Lord Chancellor Viscount Loftus refused to kneel before Lord Deputy Thomas Wentworth when delivering the Great Seal to him, contributing to the breakdown in their relationship.  In 1662, the fee to the Lord Chancellor for patents under the Great Seal was increased to 10 shillings sterling per patentee. The 1722 patent for Wood's halfpence was issued under the British seal rather than the Irish, which was among the complaints Jonathan Swift made in his Drapier's Letters condemning the currency.

During a lawsuit between the Marquess of Donegall and the Irish Society over fishing rights in Lough Neagh, Viscount Pery argued that the Society's 1662 charter was invalid as it was made under the English seal rather than the Irish one; the Irish Parliament passed an act in 1795 validating all land grants made under the English seal. The Constitution of 1782 removed the role of the British great seal in Irish legislation. Napper Tandy of the Society of United Irishmen challenged his 1792 arrest on the grounds that government officials, from the Lord Lieutenant down, had been appointed under the British rather than the Irish seal. This was intended not to persuade the judges, who vehemently rejected the argument, but to increase public sympathy.

The Act of Union 1800 provided that the Great Seal of Ireland could continue to be used in Ireland, and that at elections to the Westminster parliament for constituencies in Ireland, the writs and certified returns would be under the Irish rather than the British seal.

Design

A new seal was created for each new monarch, whose likeness would be on the obverse. (On the accession of Richard II in 1377, the seal of Edward III was re-used to save money, with only the king's name being updated.) The seal included the arms of Ireland: until 1536, three crowns; after that, an Irish harp. Oliver Cromwell's Great Seal for Ireland, cast by Thomas Simon in 1655, was similar to Simon's 1653 Great Seal for the Protectorate, with the view of London on the obverse replaced by one of Dublin, and the quartered arms on the reverse replaced with the Irish arms, still with Cromwell's arms inescutcheoned.  From Queen Victoria on, the Great Seal of Ireland had the same design as the Great Seal of the Realm except for the replacement, under the figure on the reverse, of Britannia's trident with the Irish crowned harp. James Roderick O'Flanagan described the contemporary seal in 1870:

The seal matrix was cast in silver and the impressions made in sealing wax. Irish Great Seals are attested from the thirteenth century, though surviving impressions of them are rare. Most state papers were destroyed, in multiple fires between 1304 and 1758, and in an explosion in the Battle of Dublin in 1922. According to Hilary Jenkinson, "a fairly intensive search some years [before 1954] in England and Ireland for impressions of the Irish Seals produced a total of only forty, for the period from the thirteenth century [to 1800]".

Decommissioning
The seal matrix was replaced when it was worn out and when a new monarch acceded to the throne. Once the new seal was ready, the old one was broken up or, latterly, "damasked" (ceremonially defaced) with a hammer. A custom beginning with Nicholas Bacon in England and soon extending to Ireland was that the Keeper of the Seal could melt down the decommissioned seal to make silverware, most often a so-called "Seal Cup". Lord Chancellor archbishop Adam Loftus made at least two Seal Cups for Rathfarnham Castle from Great Seals of Elizabeth I. The 1902 seal of Edward VII, which passed to Redmond Barry on the king's demise, was sold at auction in 1969 for £750.

Supersession
The Government of Ireland Act 1920 transferred custody of the seal from the Lord Chancellor to the Lord Lieutenant on 27 June 1921. The physical seal was in the Crown and Hanaper Office in the Four Courts when that was occupied by the Irish Republican Army on 14 April 1922 in the buildup to the Civil War. Under British law the writs for the Irish Free State election of 16 June 1922 had to be passed under the Great Seal, so an order in council was passed to authorise a substitute seal. The explosion in the Four Courts during the Battle of Dublin was initially assumed to have destroyed the Great Seal, but it was later found in the rubble.  The 1920 act intended the Great Seal of Ireland to be used by both Northern Ireland and Southern Ireland. Judges were appointed in 1921 and 1922 to Northern Ireland courts by letters patent under the Great Seal of Ireland. Several writs for the Westminster election of 15 November 1922 were burnt by republicans in Dublin when sent from Northern Ireland to be sealed.

The Great Seal of Ireland became obsolete on 6 December 1922, with the coming into force of the Constitution of the Irish Free State. Under the Irish Free State (Consequential Provisions) Act 1922 a separate Great Seal of Northern Ireland was created. The letters patent appointing the first Governor of Northern Ireland allowed him to use his private seal until the Great Seal was ready. Although the Free State Constitution did not mention any seal, the letters patent appointing its first Governor-General mandated use of a Great Seal of the Irish Free State, with interim provision for use of the Governor-General's private seal. The Free State Great Seal was delivered in 1925 to a design agreed by the Executive Council. In 1927, Lord Birkenhead said he supposed the obsolete pre-1922 Great Seal was in the possession of the Free State Executive Council. However, when the Free State came into being on 6 December 1922, Gerald Horan, outgoing Clerk of the Crown and Hanaper, informed Hugh Kennedy, the incoming Attorney General of Ireland, that "he had handed over the Great Seal of Ireland to the 'Imperial Representative'  at the Viceregal Lodge but was retaining the 'former' Great Seal". Some time between August 1925 and July 1927, Horan donated to the National Museum of Ireland "The Great Seal of Ireland, George V. two silver matrices."

References

Footnotes

Sources
 
 ; Vol. I, Vol. II

Citations

Further reading

External links
 National Museum of Ireland: search historical collections Search for Great Seal; items with images include seals of George III and Charles II, a pouch for the seal of William IV, a box for the seal, and a document with a seal of Victoria.

Political history of Ireland
Legal history of Ireland
Ireland
National symbols of Ireland